A kapala (Sanskrit for "skull") is a skull cup used as a ritual implement (bowl) in both Hindu Tantra and Buddhist Tantra (Vajrayana). Especially in Tibet, they are often carved or elaborately mounted with precious metals and jewels.

Etymology
'Kapala' is a loan word into Tibetan from Sanskrit kapāla (Devanagari: कपाल) referring to the skull or forehead, usually of a human. By association, it refers to the ritual skullcup fashioned out of a human cranium. The Sanskrit word, in turn, was derived from Proto Indo-Aryan *kapā́las, and descended from Proto-Indo-European *káp-ōl- (cup, bowl), from *kap- (to seize, to hold).

In Hinduism
Kapalas are used mainly for esoteric purposes such as rituals. Among the rituals using kapalas are higher tantric meditation to achieve a transcendental state of mind within the shortest possible time; libation to gods and deities to win their favor.

Hindu deities 

Hindu deities that may be depicted with the kapala include Durga, Kālī and Shiva, especially in his Bhairava form. Even Ganesha, when adopted into Tibetan Buddhism as Maharakta Ganapati, is shown with a kapala filled with blood. 

Some of the Hindu deities pictured thus are:

Kālī, pictured in the most common four-armed iconographic image, shows each hand carrying variously a sword, a trishula (trident), a severed head, and a bowl or skullcup (kapala) catching the blood of the severed head.
The Chamunda, a form of Durga, seen in the Halebidu temple built by the Hoysala, is described as wearing a garland of severed heads or skulls (Mundamala). She is described as having four, eight, ten, or twelve arms, holding a damaru (drum), trishula (trident), sword, a snake (nāga), skull-mace (khatvanga), thunderbolt (vajra), a severed head and panapatra (drinking vessel, wine cup) or skullcup (kapala), filled with blood.

Kapalikas 

The Kāpālika tradition was a Tantric, non-Puranic form of Shaivism in India. The word is derived from kapāla, meaning "skull", and Kāpālika means the "skull-men". The Kāpālikas were an extinct sect of Shaivite ascetics devoted to the Hindu god Shiva dating back to the 8th century CE, which traditionally carried a skull-topped trident (khatvanga) and an empty skull as a begging bowl.

In Buddhism

In Tibetan monasteries a kapala is used symbolically to hold bread or dough cakes, torma, and wine instead of blood and flesh as offerings to wrathful deities, such as the ferocious Dharmapāla ("defender of the faith"). The dough cakes are shaped to resemble human eyes, ears and tongues. The kapala is made in the form of a skull, specially collected and prepared. It is elaborately anointed and consecrated before use. The cup is also elaborately decorated and kept in a triangular pedestal. The heavily embossed cup is usually made of silver-gilt bronze with lid shaped like a skull and with a handle made in the form of a thunderbolt.

Vajrayana deities 

Many of the deities of Vajrayana, including mahasiddhas, dakinis and dharmapalas, are depicted as carrying the kapala, usually in their left hand. Some deities such as the Hindu Chinnamasta and the related Buddhist Vajrayogini are depicted as drinking blood from the kapala. The kapala itself is a symbol of wisdom (prajna) and knowledge. In the inner-level or subtle-body practices of Buddhist Tantra, the underside of the skull contains the moon drops, which are melted by tummo or inner heat yoga, creating a cooling sensation of bliss as the drops move through the inner channels.

As many Vajrayana empowerments such as the vase empowerment are also performed by touching the top of the head, the kapala also represents the transmission of knowledge from the Tantric guru to disciple, known as lineage transmission. As blood was associated with hell-beings and was considered to be one of the most polluting substances in the Indian Vedas, the drinking of blood was an esoteric symbol for non-discrimination. As wisdom transforms all duhkha into emptiness (sunyata), a yogi who has accomplished the siddhi of non-discriminatory awareness has broken through all illusions of duality, of purity and impurity (all constructed realities), and most importantly, nirvana and samsara.

The ability to break through the duality of nirvana and samsara results in the union of emptiness and bliss, which is the highest expression of enlightenment in Vajrayana Buddhism. In this way, the image of the dakini who not only drinks but takes pleasure and delight from consuming the blood in the kapala is a powerful symbol of a yogi who has perfected the paramita of prajna, and who dwells in the reality of non-dualism.

Charnel ground or sky burial 

The kapala is one of several charnel ground implements made from human bone found by tantrics at sky burial sites.

The charnel ground, an ancient Tibetan burial custom, is distinctly different from the customs of graveyards and cremation, but all three of them have been a part of the home ground of tantric practitioners’ such as the yogis and yoginis, Shaiva Kapalikas and Aghoris, shamans and sadhus. The charnel ground, often referred to as "sky burial" by Western sources, is an area demarcated specifically in Tibet, defined by the Tibetan word Jhator (literal meaning is ’giving alms to the birds’), a way of  exposing the corpse to nature, where human bodies are disposed as it were or in a chopped (chopped after the rituals) condition in the open ground as a ritual that has great religious meaning of the ascent of the mind to be reincarnated into another circle of life.

Such a practice results in finding human bones, half or whole skeletons, more or less putrefying corpses and disattached limbs lying scattered around. Items made from human skulls or bones are found in the sky burial grounds by the Sadhus and Yogins of the tantric cult. The charnel grounds are also known by the epithets the "field of death" or the  "valley of corpses". In Tibet,  a class distinction in the burial practices is also noted. The dead High Lamas are buried in Stupas or cremated but the dead commoners are disposed of in the Charnel ground or in a Sky burial.

The products from the charnel ground are the charnel ground ornaments such as the i) Crown of five skulls, ii) Bone necklace, iii) Bone armlets, iv)  Bone bracelets, v) Bone skirt and vi) Bone anklets which decorate  many images of dakinis, yoginis, dharmapalas and a few other deities (as may be seen in some of the pictures and stone images depicted in the gallery here), and other products such as the Bone trumpet, the Skull cup and Skull drum used by the tantric practitioners. Kapala or the skull cup is thus a produce from the Charnel ground.

Gallery

See also
Chöd
Ganachakra
Sahasrara

Notes

External links

The Yoniverse. Skull Cup

Tibetan Buddhist ritual implements
Hindu tantra
Tantric practices
Tibetan Buddhist practices
Bone carvings